is a mountain in Yasugi, Shimane Prefecture, Japan, with a height of 331 metres. 
It is mentioned in Japanese myth as the place where Izanami was buried.

See also

 Mount Hiba (Hiroshima)

References

Hiba